The Bishop of Leeds is the Ordinary of the Roman Catholic Diocese of Leeds in the Province of Liverpool, England.

The Vicariate Apostolic of the Yorkshire District was elevated to diocese status as the Diocese of Beverley on 29 September 1850, which was suppressed on 20 December 1878 and its area was divided into the dioceses of Leeds and Middlesbrough.

The see is in the city of Leeds where the bishop's seat is located at the Cathedral Church of Saint Anne, Cookridge Street.

On 15 September 2014, Pope Francis appointed Monsignor Marcus Stock, at the time, the General Secretary of the Bishops' Conference, as the 10th Bishop of Leeds. He was consecrated as Bishop on 13 November 2014.

List of the Bishops of Leeds

References

 
Roman Catholic Diocese of Leeds